Richard Stanley Zemel (born 1963) is a Canadian-American computer scientist and professor at Columbia University, Department of Computer Science, and a leading figure in the field of Machine Learning and Computer Vision.

Zemel obtained his Ph.D under Geoffrey Hinton from the University of Toronto Department of Computer Science in 1994.

See also
 Helmholtz machine

References

External links
 

Artificial intelligence researchers
Harvard University alumni
American computer scientists
Canadian computer scientists
Living people
Machine learning researchers
Academic staff of the University of Toronto
Canada Research Chairs
Canadian cognitive scientists
University of Toronto alumni
1963 births